There have been two, unrelated firms using the name Baltimore Type Foundry.

First Baltimore Type Foundry

The first Baltimore Type Foundry, considered to be the second oldest type foundry in the United States, was founded around 1799 by Samuel Sower and was continued by his son-in-law, Richard Spaulding. In 1832, the business was sold to Fielding Lucas Jr., and it remained in the Lucas family until 1879 when it was sold to Henry Lafayette Pelouze, owner of the Richmond Type Foundry, and it operated as a branch of that foundry until 1883. It was subsequently purchased by Charles J. Carey & Co. and operated independently until it was merged into American Type Founders at its formation in 1892. A year after A. P. Luse died in 1891, the foundry became one of the twenty-three foundries that merged to become American Type Founders.

Typefaces
These foundry types were originally cast by the first Baltimore Type Foundry:

Baltotype

The second Baltimore Type & Composition Co., better known as Baltotype, or just Balto, was founded in the early twentieth century by the Czarnowski family and remained in business until at least 1978.  It was a "secondary foundry", mostly casting from matrixes made by Lanston Monotype Company or British Monotype, though they also cut a few faces of their own. A subsidiary, Baltimore Matrix, made these available to other secondary foundries in various cities.

Typefaces
These foundry types were cast by the first Baltimore Type Foundry. Some were original, and others were fonts from other foundries sold under new names:

References

Manufacturing companies based in Baltimore
Letterpress font foundries of the United States
American companies established in 1799
Defunct companies based in Baltimore 
Manufacturing companies disestablished in 1978
Design companies disestablished in 1978
American companies disestablished in 1978
Defunct manufacturing companies based in Maryland